F. H. W. Briggman House is a historic house located at 156 Amelia Street in Orangeburg, Orangeburg County, South Carolina. The house originally served as the home of Frederick Briggman, the first mayor of Orangeburg.

Description and history 
It was built about 1855, and is a -story, rectangular, frame vernacular Greek Revival dwelling. It has a gable roof, three exterior stuccoed brick end chimneys, and a rear addition. The front facade features a two-tiered recessed porch.

It was added to the National Register of Historic Places on September 20, 1985.

References

Houses on the National Register of Historic Places in South Carolina
Greek Revival houses in South Carolina
Houses completed in 1855
Houses in Orangeburg County, South Carolina
National Register of Historic Places in Orangeburg County, South Carolina